Valentin Trujillo Gazcón (28 March 1951 – 4 May 2006) was a Mexican actor, writer and director.  His career spanned 48 years, where he appeared in over 140 films and directed 20 films. He starts as a child actor during the Golden Age of Mexican cinema.

Early life
Trujillo was born on March 28, 1951 in a show business family as his grandfather was film producer Valentín Gazcón and his uncle was actor Gilberto Gazcón.  He made his film debut as a baby.

Trujillo initially studied law at Universidad Nacional Autónoma de México (UNAM).  He never completed his studies, choosing instead to become an actor.

Career

Early career
Trujillo made his acting debut at the age of seven in the film El Gran Pillo (1958).  As a teen he got into the Columbia Pictures release Rage (1966) alongside Glenn Ford and Stella Stevens.

Stardom
Beginning in the early 1970s, Trujillo was cast often as the male lead.  The film Las figuras de arena (1970) directed by Roberto Gavaldón established him as a leading man.  He worked steadily as the leading man in action films over the next decade, completing over 30 films between 1970 and 1979.

In addition to action films, Trujillo expanded his range in a number of films that incorporated commentary about modern social issues and politics in Mexico.  The film Perro Callejero (1980) won a Silver Goddess for Best Picture and Trujillo, who portrayed the lead drunken character, was awarded Best Actor by Premios ACE.

Later career & death
Beginning in the 1980s, Trujillo stepped behind the camera as well and began writing and directing his films.  He released several popular action films and was soon the top box office draw in Mexico.

Trujillo was nominated for several Ariel Awards in the 1980s, including Best Supporting Actor for El Ansia de Matar (1987) and Best Story and Screenplay for  Violación (1989).  The latter also was the first film to co-star his son, Valentin Trujillo Jr.  Together they co-starred in close to 20 films together before Trujillo's untimely death.

Trujillo died on May 4, 2006 in his sleep from a heart attack.  He was 55 at the time of his death.

Actor 

2007: Así me lo conto el abuelo   (video)
2000: 2000 Entre perico y perico       (video)
1999: El comerciante       (video)
1999: Horas amargas      
1999: La danza del venado      
1999: Las dos hectareas       (video)
1999: Mi oficio es ser asaltante       (video)
1999: Mis animales y yo      
1999: Polícia de narcóticos 2      
1998: Cuatro meses de libertad      Director de Cine
1998: Derrumbe mortal      
1998: El mochaorejas      
1998: Fiera salvaje       (video)
1998: Juramento cumplido       (video)
1998: La 4X4      
1998: La Dinastia de los Quintero       (video)
1998: Lluvia de plomo       (video)
1998: Masacre en Ensenada       (video)
1998: Mi último contrabando       (video)
1998: Sucedió en el aguaje      
1998: Un pasado violento       (video)
1997: Amor en tiempos de coca      
1997: Caceria de judiciales      
1997: Caminero      Don Atenor
1997: Con fuego en la sangre       (video)
1997: Destino traidor       (video)
1997: El gallo galindo      
1997: El manco      
1997: Entre cartas y gallos       (video)
1997: Pesadilla infernal      
1997: Ratas de barrio      
1997: Secuestradores      
1997: Traición en la hacienda       (video)
1997: Un alacran y un gallo       (video)
1997: Violencia policiaca      
1996: Balneario Nacional       (video)
1996: Destino final      
1996: El chacal del puerto       (video)
1996: El maldito       (video)
1996: El rigór de la ley      
1996: Intriga en el paraíso      Fernando
1996: Juventud en drogas      
1996: Operación masacre       (video)
1996: Sangre salvaje       (video)
1996: Trampa para un inocente       (video)
1996: Víctimas de la ambición      Ing. Fernando Cortés
1996: Violencia perversa       (video)
1995: Al son de la metralleta      German Funes
1995: Atrapados      Perro
1995: Pistoleros anonimos       (video)
1995: Rafaga de cuerno de chivo       (video)
1995: Tiempo de muerte 2      Robles
1995: Violencia en la obscuridad      
1995: Violencia en la oscuridad      
1995: Violencia en la sierra      Valente Rojas
1994: Desesperación criminal       (video)
1994: Imposible de matar      
1994: Juego violento       (video)
1994: Tiempo de muerte       (video)
1993: Burlando la ley      Jorge
1993: Hombres de acero      
1992: Secuestro de un periodista      
1992: Venganza      
1991: La verdadera historia de Barman y Droguin      El Ejecutor
1991: Un hombre despiadado      
1990: El último escape      Revendedor
1990: Carrera contra la muerte      
1990: Cargando con el tiezo      
1990: Jefe policiaco      
1989: Violación      
1989: Atrapado      
1988: Mi fantasma y yo      
1988: En peligro de muerte      
1988: A sangre y fuego      
1987: Cacería humana      
1987: Ansia de matar      
1987: La pandilla infernal      Lorenzo Rojas
1987: Yo el ejecutor      
1987: Dias de matanza      
1986: Policía de narcóticos      Julian Carrera 
1986: El cafre      
1986: Ratas de la ciudad      Pedro
1986: Un hombre violento      Julian Carrera
1985: Juana Iris      (TV series) Bernardo (1985)
1984: Perros salvajes     
1983: Dos de abajo     
1983: Las modelos de desnudos     
1983: Fieras en brama     
1983: Demon Hunter     Herrero
1982: El Bronco     
1981: Perro callejero II     El Perro
1981: La muerte del Palomo     
1980: El hombre sin miedo     Domingo Aparicio
1980: Hijos de tigre     
1980: Los dos amigos     
1980: Del otro lado del puente     
1980: Perro callejero      
1980: Tres de presidio     
1979: La banda del Polvo Maldito     
1979: El hijo del palenque     
1979: Mexicano hasta las cachas     Mauro
1979: El valiente vive... hasta que el cobarde quiere     Fernando
1978: Pasiones encendidas    (TV series)   Marcial (1978)
1978: Son tus perjúmenes mujer     
1978: Death in Cold Blood     
1978: Mataron a Camelia la Texana     
1978: Raza de viboras     
1978: Carroña     
1977: ¿Y ahora qué, señor fiscal?     José  (as Valentin Trujillo)
1977: Contrabando y traición     Emilio Varela
1977: Traigo la sangre caliente     
1977: Como gallos de pelea     
1976: La virgen de Guadalupe     Temoch
1976: Acorralados     
1976: Alas doradas     
1976: Mañana será otro día    (TV series)  Roberto
1975: La otra virginidad     
1975: Simon Blanco     Capuleque
1974: Cabalgando a la luna     
1974: El desconocido     
1973: Novios y amantes     
1973: Cuando quiero llorar no lloro     Victorino Peralta
1973: El diablo en persona     Guadalupe Padilla
1972: Cuna de valientes     Roberto Otero
1972: El ausente     Valente Rojas Jr.
1972: Hoy he soñado con Dios     Antonio
1971: Más allá de la violencia     
1971: Ya somos hombres     
1971: El juicio de los hijos     Alberto
1971: Pequeñeces      (TV series)
1970: Simplemente vivir     Gerardo
1970: Las figuras de arena     
1968: México de noche     Julio
1966: Rage     José
1963: Smiles of the City     
1962: Behind the Clouds     Niño herido (uncredited)
1962: El Extra      (as Valentin Trujillo Gazcón)
1961: Juan sin miedo      (uncredited) 
1961: Three Sad Tigers     
1961: Suerte te dé Dios     Hijo de Chon
1960: El gran pillo     (as Valentín Trujillo Gazcón)

External links

1951 births
2006 deaths
Golden Ariel Award winners
Ariel Award winners
Mexican male film actors